
Xima may refer to these places in China:

Towns
Xima, Longli County (洗马), in Longli County, Guizhou
Xima, Meitan County (洗马), in Meitan County, Guizhou
Xima, Xishui County (洗马), in Xishui County, Hubei
Xima, Yunnan (昔马), in Yingjiang County, Yunnan

Townships
Xima Township, Hunan (洗马乡), in Hongjiang, Hunan
Xima Township, Shanxi (西马乡), in Yushe County, Shanxi

Subdistricts
Xima Subdistrict, Jieyang (西马街道), in Rongcheng District, Jieyang, Guangdong
Xima Subdistrict, Wuhan (西马街道), in Jiang'an District, Wuhan, Hubei

See also
Qiema (郄马), a town in Shijiazhuang, Hebei